International development consulting organizations work in the field of International development, where they advise and support governments, international agencies, non-profits, or corporations on specific projects. The international development consulting industry is itself composed of for-profit firms, non-profits, hybrid models, and various multinational institutions.

Scope

The work of international development consultants covers a wide range of areas, including (but not limited to):

 Economics
 Financial advising (e.g.: sovereign funds or development funds)
 Foreign aid management
 Governance
 Healthcare
 Education
 Gender equality
 Disaster preparedness
 Infrastructure
 Human rights
 Environmental Policy
 Energy policy

External links
 Official website

International development